The Motor Bob was an American cyclecar manufactured in Buffalo, New York, from 1911 to 1915.

History 

A single-cylinder, 2½hp vehicle, the Motor Bob was sold for home assembly by "boys from 12 to 15". Plans could be purchased for 25 cents.  From advertisements, by 1912 Motor Bob was also sold as the Niagara Motor Bob by the makers of the Lad's Car.  The completed car was 96 inches long 31 inches wide and weighed 150 pounds. Speeds of up to 15 mph were claimed. E. N. Bowen made all the parts of the Motor-Bob himself, and a all parts for the cyclecar could be purchased for $125 in 1914.

References

Defunct motor vehicle manufacturers of the United States
Cyclecars
Kit car manufacturers
1910s cars
Brass Era vehicles

Motor vehicle manufacturers based in New York (state)
Vehicle manufacturing companies established in 1911
Vehicle manufacturing companies disestablished in 1915
Cars introduced in 1911